Yefri Pérez Martínez (born February 24, 1991) is a Dominican professional baseball outfielder for the Charleston Dirty Birds of the Atlantic League of Professional Baseball. He has played in Major League Baseball (MLB) for the Miami Marlins.

Career

Miami Marlins
On December 13, 2008, Pérez signed with the Miami Marlins organization as an international as an international free agent. He made his professional debut for the Dominican Summer League Marlins in 2009, hitting .236 in 59 games.

In 2010, Pérez played for the rookie-level GCL Marlins, hitting .290/.333/.312 in 30 games. In 2011, Pérez split the year between the GCL Marlins and the Low-A Jamestown Jammers, accumulating a .241/.266/.323 slash line with no home runs and 18 RBI. The following season, Pérez returned to Jamestown and hit .280/.325/.357 with 1 home run and 16 RBI. Pérez split the 2013 season between the Low-A Batavia Muckdogs, the Single-A Greensboro Grasshoppers, and the High-A Jupiter Hammerheads, slashing .229/.268/.340 with a career-high 3 home runs and 18 RBI in 48 games between the three teams. In 118 games for Greensboro in 2014, Pérez batted .287/.335/.335 with 1 home run and 29 RBI. In 2015, Pérez spent the season in Jupiter, logging a .240/.286/.269 slash line with 1 home run and 22 RBI in 135 games. He began the 2016 season with the Double-A Jacksonville Suns.

Pérez was selected to the 40-man roster and called up to the Major Leagues for the first time on July 3, 2016, as their 26th man for the Fort Bragg Game, but was optioned to the minors the next day without appearing in a game. He was called up a second time on July 15, and made his debut two days later as a pinch runner for Cole Gillespie, stealing a base and scoring against the St. Louis Cardinals. Pérez finished his rookie season 2-for-3 with 4 stolen bases in 12 major league appearances with Miami. He was assigned to Jacksonville to begin the 2017 season. Pérez was designated for assignment on May 12, 2017, to create roster space for Mike Avilés. On May 15, Pérez was sent outright to Double-A, and hit .169 in 76 games with the team. On November 6, he elected free agency.

St. Louis Cardinals
On March 9, 2018, Pérez signed a minor league contract with the St. Louis Cardinals. He was released by the Cardinals organization on March 28.

Acereros de Monclova
On April 18, 2018, Pérez signed with the Acereros de Monclova of the Mexican League. In 50 games with Monclova, Pérez hit 4 home runs with 26 RBI and 16 stolen bases. He became a free agent following the 2018 season.

Pericos de Puebla
On July 12, 2019, Pérez signed with the Pericos de Puebla of the Mexican League. He was released on July 27, after hitting .298/.393/.511 in 12 games with the team.

High Point Rockers
On August 29, 2019, Pérez signed with the High Point Rockers of the Atlantic League of Professional Baseball. Pérez did not appear in a game for the team and became a free agent after the season. Pérez did not appear for a team in 2020 or 2021.

York Revolution
On February 22, 2022, Pérez signed with the York Revolution of the Atlantic League of Professional Baseball. Pérez appeared in 106 games for York in 2022, batting .276/.326/.415 with 7 home runs, 31 RBI, and 30 stolen bases.

Charleston Dirty Birds
On January 23, 2023, Pérez signed with the Charleston Dirty Birds of the Atlantic League of Professional Baseball.

References

External links

1991 births
Living people
Acereros de Monclova players
Águilas Cibaeñas players
Baseball players at the 2020 Summer Olympics
Medalists at the 2020 Summer Olympics
Olympic medalists in baseball
Olympic bronze medalists for the Dominican Republic
Batavia Muckdogs players
Dominican Republic expatriate baseball players in Mexico
Dominican Republic expatriate baseball players in the United States
Dominican Summer League Marlins players
Greensboro Grasshoppers players
Gulf Coast Marlins players
Jacksonville Jumbo Shrimp players
Jacksonville Suns players
Jamestown Jammers players
Jupiter Hammerheads players
Major League Baseball outfielders
Major League Baseball players from the Dominican Republic
Mexican League baseball second basemen
Mexican League baseball outfielders
Miami Marlins players
Mesa Solar Sox players
Pericos de Puebla players
Yaquis de Obregón players
York Revolution
Olympic baseball players of the Dominican Republic